Football Club Slivnishki Geroy are a Bulgarian association football club based in Slivnitsa, Sofia Province, currently playing in the South-West Third League. Their home ground since 1966 has been Slivnishki Geroi Stadium. The team has played in blue and white stripes throughout most of its history.

Honours 
B PFG
Fourth place: 1974–75
South-West V AFG
Champions (2): 1969–70, 2010–11

History 

Slivnishki Geroi was founded in 1924. The club has played 13 seasons at B PFG - the second level of Bulgarian football (including continuously from 1970 to 1983). Slivnishki Geroi's best season in the second division was in the 1974–75 season - 4th place. In 1982–83 season Slivnishki Geroi won just eleven games in the B PFG campaign and were relegated to the amateur V AFG, the third tier of the Bulgarian football league pyramid. Year later, the team relegated to fourth division.

In 2001 Slivnishki Geroi secured promotion to the third division. In 2004 Radoslav Zdravkov was appointed manager on a two-year contract.

Slivnishki Geroi finished the 2010–11 South-West V AFG Championship as champions and will return to the B PFG during 2011–12 for the first time in 28 years.

League positions

Stadiums 
Between 1924 and 1966, Slivnishki Geroi played at two grounds in the town, on the military division in Slivnitsa and on the Machine-tractor stations, but in 1966, the club moved to Slivnishki Geroi Stadium and have played there ever since. The stadium has a current capacity of 7,000.

Current squad 
As of 1 July 2019

External links
Official site

Slivnishki geroi
1924 establishments in Bulgaria